Several Canadian naval units have been named HMCS Iroquois.

, a Second World War Tribal-class destroyer.
, an Iroquois-class (or New-Tribal-class) destroyer commissioned in 1972.

Battle honours
Atlantic, 1943
Arctic, 1943–1945
Biscay, 1943–1944
Norway, 1945
Korea, 1952–1953
 Arabian Sea

References

Directory of History and Heritage - HMCS Iroquois 
 South-West Asia Theatre Honours

Royal Canadian Navy ship names